John Sebastian Östling (born 2 June 1984 in Onsala, Kungsbacka) is a Swedish sailor, who specialized in two-person dinghy (470) class. He represented Sweden, along with his partner Anton Dahlberg, in two editions of the Olympic Games (2008 and 2012), and has also been training for Royal Swedish Yacht Club throughout most of his sporting career under his personal coach and mentor Per Frykholm. As of September 2013, Ostling is ranked no. 25 in the world for two-person dinghy class by the International Sailing Federation.

Ostling made his official debut at the 2008 Summer Olympics in Beijing, where he paired up with skipper Anton Dahlberg in the men's 470 class. The Swedish duo finished fifteenth in a ten-round opening series with a net score of 111, trailing Israelis Gideon Kliger and Udi Gal by a narrow, three-point gap from the final standings.

At the 2012 Summer Olympics in London, Ostling competed for the second time as a crew member in the men's 470 class by finishing eleventh and receiving a berth from the ISAF World Championships in Perth, Western Australia. Teaming again with Dahlberg in the opening series, the Swedish duo mounted four top 10 finishes to guarantee a spot in the final race, but fell short for the podium with an accumulated net score of 123 points and a tenth-place finish in a fleet of twenty-seven boats.

Results

References

External links
 
 
 
 
  (archive)

1984 births
Living people
Swedish male sailors (sport)
Olympic sailors of Sweden
Sailors at the 2008 Summer Olympics – 470
Sailors at the 2012 Summer Olympics – 470
People from Kungsbacka Municipality
Royal Swedish Yacht Club sailors
Sportspeople from Halland County
21st-century Swedish people